The Khuddaka Nikāya is the last of the five Nikāyas, or collections, in the Sutta Pitaka, which is one of the "three baskets" that compose the Pali Tipitaka, the sacred scriptures of Theravada Buddhism.  This nikaya consists of fifteen (Thailand), fifteen (Sri Lanka follows Buddhaghosa's list), or eighteen books (Burma) in different editions on various topics attributed to the Lord Buddha and his chief disciples.

The equivalent collection in the Chinese and Tibetan canons is the Kṣudraka Āgama, but there is substantial variation among the collections.

Historical development 

Hirakawa Akira has stated that the Khuddaka Nikaya represent a stage in the development of the Pali Canon / Agamas in which new material was not added any more to the rest of the Sutta Pitaka, but was added to a 'Khuddaka Pitaka' instead. This Khuddaka Pitaka was the repository for materials that were left out of the four Agamas/Nikayas (the Digha Nikaya, Majjhima Nikaya, Samyutta Nikaya and Anguttara Nikaya) and thus included both early and late texts. Some of the other schools that included a Khuddaka Pitaka in their canons were the Mahisasaka, Dharmaguptaka and Mahasanghika. The Khuddaka Nikaya of the Theravada school is the only complete extant example of such a Khuddaka Pitaka. Some texts from the Dharmaguptaka Kṣudraka Āgama are preserved in Chinese and Tibetan translation, and fragments of Gandhari versions have also been discovered.

On the dating of the various books in the Khuddaka Nikaya, Oliver Abeynayake notes that:

Contents

This nikaya contains some or all of the following texts:
 Khuddakapatha
 Dhammapada
 Udana
 Itivuttaka
 Suttanipata
 Vimanavatthu
 Petavatthu
 Theragatha
 Therigatha
 Jataka
 Niddesa
 Patisambhidamagga
 Apadana
 Buddhavamsa
 Cariyapitaka
 Nettipakarana or Netti (included in Burmese and Sinhalese editions, but not in Thai edition)
 Petakopadesa (included in Burmese and Sinhalese editions, but not in Thai edition)
 Milindapanha (included in Burmese edition, but not in Sinhalese and Thai editions)

The introduction to the Sumangalavilasini, the commentary on the Digha Nikaya compiled in the fourth or fifth century by Buddhaghosa on the basis of earlier commentaries that no longer survive, says that the reciters of the Digha listed 2-12 in this nikaya, while the reciters of the Majjhima Nikaya listed 2-15. Later, it gives a listing of the contents of the Canon also found in the introductions to the commentaries on the Vinaya and Abhidhamma Pitakas, which gives 1-15 for this nikaya, though it also includes an alternative classification in which the Vinaya and Abhidhamma are also included in this nikaya, so that the five nikayas are a classification of the whole Canon, not just the Sutta Pitaka. Scholars conclude on the basis of these lists that 13-15 were added later, and 1 later still.

Both surviving subcommentaries on the passage about reciters explain the apparent difference between the reciters as being, not a substantive disagreement on the contents of the Canon, but merely a nominal one on its classification. Thus they say for example that the Digha reciters did regard 15 as canonical but counted it as part of 10 instead of a separate book. Similarly, the more recent subcommentary, compiled by the head of the Burmese sangha about two centuries ago, says that 16 and 17 were counted as part of 11 and/or 12.

The full list of 18 books is included in the inscriptions approved by the Burmese Fifth Buddhist council and in the printed edition of the text recited at the Sixth Council.

Translations

The following translations include material from at least two books of the Khuddaka Nikaya. For translations of individual books, see the separate articles.

 Psalms of the Early Buddhists, 9 & 8 tr C. A. F. Rhys Davids, Pali Text Society, Bristol; originally published separately
 Minor Anthologies of the Pali Canon, 1931–75, 4 volumes, Pali Text Society, Bristol; translations of 2, 1, 3, 4, 14, 15, 6, 7
 The Udana and the Itivuttaka, tr John D. Ireland, Buddhist Publication Society, Kandy, Sri Lanka; originally published separately

See also
 Pāli Canon
 Sutta Piṭaka
 Anguttara Nikaya
 Digha Nikaya
 Majjhima Nikaya
 Samyutta Nikaya
 Aṭṭhakavagga and Pārāyanavagga
 Niddesa
 Early Buddhist Texts
 Dhammapada
 Udāna
 Itivuttaka
 Sutta Nipāta
 Theragatha
 Therīgāthā

Notes

External links
Khuddaka Nikaya in Pali and English at "MettaNet - Lanka"
 Khuddaka Nikaya in English at "Access to Insight"

 
Theravada Buddhist texts